Clavidesmus lichenigerus is a species of beetle in the family Cerambycidae. It was described by Lane in 1958, originally under the genus Orteguaza. It is known from Peru, Colombia, Brazil, and Honduras.

References

Onciderini
Beetles described in 1958